Graham William Allen (born 11 January 1953) is a British Labour Party politician, who was the Member of Parliament (MP) for Nottingham North from 1987 to 2017. He stood down at the 2017 general election.

Early life
Born in 1953 in Aspley, Nottingham, he was educated at the local Robert Shaw Primary School and Forest Fields Grammar School in Forest Fields. He graduated from City of London Polytechnic, and received an MA from the University of Leeds.

He joined the Labour Party in 1971 whilst working as a warehouse worker. He worked from 1978 to 1983 as a Research Officer with the Labour Party. In 1982 he was elected as a councillor to the London Borough of Tower Hamlets, which he served until 1986. He was a local government officer at the Greater London Council between 1983 and 1984, before working for the trade union movement, running the first political fund ballots, and then with the GMB until his election in 1987.

Parliamentary career
Allen was elected as the Labour MP for the Nottingham North constituency at the 1987 general election, gaining the seat from the Conservative's Richard Ottaway with a majority of 1,665 votes. His majority at the 2010 general election was 8,138.

After helping to organise Tony Blair's leadership campaign, Allen was given a series of shadow portfolios, including social security, transport and the environment. After the Labour Party came to power at the 1997 general election Allen became a government whip until after the 2001 general election, when he returned to the backbenches.

Allen was liberated by his move to the backbenches, which freed him to speak out publicly on the few elements of government policy he opposed. Allen took a stand against the Iraq War, and with his Constituency Agent Ian Murphy, he stood at the forefront of a successful campaign to recall Parliament in September 2002, attempting to organise an unofficial recall if the House would not formally sit.

Allen sat on a number of parliamentary select committees, and was the Chair of the Political and Constitutional Reform Select Committee in the House of Commons from 2010 to 2015. He is also a member of the Speaker's Committee on the Electoral Commission.

Allen is a patron of Humanists UK (formerly British Humanist Association) and has campaigned against faith schools in the United Kingdom. He is an honorary associate of the National Secular Society.

In 2011, he voted against the military intervention in Libya.

Allen announced he would stand down at the 2017 general election due to ill health.

Democratic Reform
Allen was a proponent of democratic reform and supported independent local government, some proportional representation and a fully elected House of Lords. He introduced a bill calling for a written constitution in the UK.

In 1995, he wrote "Reinventing Democracy" and in November 2002 he published The Last Prime Minister: Being Honest About the UK Presidency, claiming that the UK effectively had a presidency. He argued that the Prime Minister (or 'President', as he referred to the office throughout the book) should be directly and separately elected in order for a better separation of powers. This new arrangement, he argued, would be best spelled out "in plain English" in a written constitution. Allen argues that a codified constitution would institutionalise the informal powers that the British prime minister has obtained, subsequently creating a system of checks and balances that act to limit the power of the prime minister.

Allen expanded on this in 2019, when he launched plans for a Citizens Convention on UK Democracy with cross-party support from MPs including Vince Cable, David Davis, Dominic Grieve, Caroline Lucas and Tom Watson. The Convention aims to involve millions of people in a process of recommending changes to improve democracy including a review of the Parliamentary "Second Chamber", the House of Lords, devolution and the regions, paying for politics, the voting system and a written constitution to enshrine in law things done by convention that do not currently exist in a statute.

The Convention is planned to convene in 2020 and run through to the end of 2021.

Early Intervention

Allen was a strong advocate of early intervention in social issues. He wrote "Early Intervention, good parents, great kids, better citizens" with Iain Duncan Smith in 2009. He wrote two reports for the government on the topic in 2011.

Constituency
In October 2005, Allen became the first MP to Chair a Local Strategic Partnership, which was subsequently renamed One Nottingham. Allen set it the mission of making Nottingham an "Early Intervention City".

References

External links

Graham Allen Profile at New Statesman

1953 births
Living people
Alumni of London Guildhall University
Alumni of the University of Leeds
British secularists
Councillors in the London Borough of Tower Hamlets
English humanists
Labour Party (UK) MPs for English constituencies
Politicians from Nottingham
Transport and General Workers' Union-sponsored MPs
UK MPs 1987–1992
UK MPs 1992–1997
UK MPs 1997–2001
UK MPs 2001–2005
UK MPs 2005–2010
UK MPs 2010–2015
UK MPs 2015–2017